Araxá is a municipality in Western Minas Gerais state, Brazil.

Geography

Demographics
Population in 1970: 35,676
Population in 1980: 53,404
Population in 1991: 65,911
Population in 2000: 78,997 (77,743 lived in the urban area)
Population in 2010: 93,071
Population in 2020: 107,337

Origin of the name
The town was named after the Amerindian tribe of the Araxás who lived there at the time it was first discovered. The name means "the place from where the sun is seen first".

Araxó, an extinct Jê language, was once spoken in the municipality.

Micro-region
Araxá is the center of a statistical micro-region including 10 municipalities: Araxá, Campos Altos, Ibiá, Nova Ponte, Pedrinópolis, Perdizes, Pratinha, Sacramento, Santa Juliana, and Tapira.

Neighboring municipalities
The neighboring municipalities are Perdizes (N and NW), Ibiá (E), Tapira (S), and Sacramento (SW).

Communications
Araxá is served by a good system of federal and state highways that link the municipality to the main economic centers of the country.  The highways with access to Araxá are:
BR 452 – Araxá/Uberlândia/Tupaciguara
BR 262 – Belo Horizonte/Vitória/Corumbá)
MG 428 – As far as the border of Minas Gerais – São Paulo

Transport
The city is served by the Araxá Airport, which has daily flights to Belo Horizonte, Uberaba, Uberlândia and São Paulo.

The Centro Atlântica Railway goes through the city, but it is limited to cargo transport.

Distances
Brasília: 
Rio de Janeiro: 
Uberaba: 
São Paulo:

Economic activities

The economy is based on tourism, services, mining, industry, and some agriculture.

Araxá is famous in Brazil for its spa with medicinal mud and mineral waters.  One of Brazil's most emblematic hotels, the Grande Hotel, is the center of attraction.  Opened in 1944 by governor Benedito Valadares and President Vargas, the Hotel initiated an era of splendor to Araxá and the inland region of the state. It was the stage for huge social, political and cultural events.  Overall, the city's hotel sector has 24 establishments offering 2,708 beds (2004).
One of Brazil's most famous soap operas, Dona Beija, loosely based on the life of a legendary historic character of the city, was filmed here.

In addition to tourism, the city has a niobium mine. That metal is used in special steels and alloys for jet engine components, rocket sub-assemblies, and heat-resisting and combustion equipment.  Reserves are about 460 million tons, sufficient to satisfy current world demand for about 500 years.  The largest enterprise in this sector is CBMM—Companhia Brasileira de Metalurgia e Mineração.

Araxá is also a major producer of phosphate concentrate, essential for the production of fertilizers.  The most important company in this sector is Vale Fertilizantes S.A., with the largest single superphosphate production plant in Brazil.

The GDP in Brazilian reais was 1.439 billion in 2005. This was generated almost evenly by services and industry. In 2005 there were 2,865 workers in industry, 1,478 in construction, 7,636 in commerce, 1,296 in restaurants and hotels, and 2,691 in public administration. Around 1,500 persons were employed in agriculture. There were 65,000 head of cattle, most of which was for dairy production. The municipality produced approximately  a day (2004). There is also a large production of poultry and swine. There were 22 producers of cachaça, a Brazilian rum, in 2004. The main crops are coffee, corn, and soybeans.

Health and education
In the health sector there were 17 health clinics and 4 hospitals with 244 beds (2005).  There were 6 clinical analysis labs and 34 pharmacies.  Two of the hospitals are private and 2 are philanthropic.  Educational needs of 10,500 students were met by 33 primary schools, 11 middle schools, and 40 pre-primary schools.  In higher education there were 2 schools:  Centro Universitário Planalto de Araxá and UNIT – Universidade do Triângulo Mineiro.

There was one doctor for every 598 inhabitants (2004) and 3.5 hospital beds for every 1,000 inhabitants.  The infant mortality rate was 8.70 deaths for every 1,000 live births (2004), well below the state and national average.  In 2000 the number was 20.80.

Municipal Human Development Index: 0.799 (2000)
State ranking: 40 out of 853 municipalities as of 2000
National ranking: 579 out of 5,138 municipalities as of 2000
Literacy rate: 93%
Life expectancy: 70 (average of males and females)

In 2000 the per capita monthly income of R$337.00 was above the state and national average of R$276.00 and R$297.00 respectively.

The highest ranking municipality in Minas Gerais in 2000 was Poços de Caldas with 0.841, while the lowest was Setubinha with 0.568.  Nationally the highest was São Caetano do Sul in São Paulo with 0.919, while the lowest was Setubinha.  In more recent statistics (considering 5,507 municipalities) Manari in the state of Pernambuco has the lowest rating in the country—0,467—putting it in last place.

References

External links
Official government site

Municipalities in Minas Gerais